Rafig Eyyub oglu Huseynov (1946 – 2017) was a Soviet–Azerbaijani TV announcer, host, actor and singer. He had received the honorary title of the People's Artist of the Azerbaijani SSR in 1990, and was awarded the State Prize of the Azerbaijani SSR in 1991.

Early life 
Rafig Eyyub oglu Huseynov was born on 4 August 1946, in Shusha of the Nagorno-Karabakh Autonomous Oblast, the Azerbaijani SSR, which was then part of the Soviet Union. Born into a merchant family, he grew up in Baku, and lost his father in an early age. Huseynov entered the Azerbaijan State Institute of Arts and graduated from there in 1976.

Career 
Huseynov worked as an illuminator at the State Committee for Radio and Television Broadcasting under the Council of Ministers of the Azerbaijani SSR from July 1964. He worked as an announcer from January 1966. Later, Huseynov worked as deputy chairman of the Azerbaijan State Television and Radio Broadcasting Company.

Hosting numerous shows on the Azerbaijani television, including the news program, as well as many interviews and on-screen concerts, he was distinguished by recognizable timbre of voice, peculiar manner of broadcasting, and had played an active role in the formation of the Azerbaijani television. Thus, he was called the Azerbaijani Leviathan by some. In the early 1990s, Huseynov, as an announcer, had provided information about the Black January and the Nagorno-Karabakh conflict. Though Huseynov left the television in the early 1990s, and continued his career as a singer. He returned to television in 2005, taking the post of artistic director of the TV presenter of the AzTV.

He died on 26 October 2017, in Düsseldorf, Germany. He was buried in the Yasamal Cemetery of Baku on 3 November 2017, after a farewell ceremony at the Rashid Behbudov State Song Theatre.

Awards 
 Honored Artist of the Azerbaijani SSR. (1979)
 People's Artist of the Azerbaijani SSR. (1990)
 State Prize of the Azerbaijani SSR. (1991)

References 

1946 births
2017 deaths
Artists from Shusha
Azerbaijani television presenters
People's Artists of Azerbaijan